Cimet or CIMET may refer to:

Mount Cimet, a mountain in Alpes-de-Haute-Provence, France
Color in Informatics and Media Technology, a multimedia master's degree